Ratchadamri Road (also spelled Rajdamri) is a road in Bangkok. It passes through Ratchaprasong Intersection at the heart of Bangkok's main shopping district, as well as the green open spaces of the Royal Bangkok Sports Club and Lumphini Park, making its eponymous neighbourhood one of the top prime real estate locations in Bangkok.

The neighbourhood known as Ratchadamri is situated south of Ratchaprasong on the road's eastern side, opposite the Royal Bangkok Sports Club. It consists mostly of land owned by Vajiravudh College, purposely set aside by King Vajiravudh as the school's endowment. The area, served by the Ratchadamri Station of the BTS's Silom Line, is home to a large concentration of luxury condominiums and hotels, and has the most expensive condominium sell prices in Bangkok.

References

Streets in Bangkok
Neighbourhoods of Bangkok
Pathum Wan district